Oenomaus gwenish is a species of butterfly of the family Lycaenidae. It is probably a lower montane species, so far known only from wet forest at 1,000 meters elevation in Darién, Panama.

The length of the forewings is 20 mm for females.

Etymology
The species is named for entomologist Dr. Jennifer (Gwen) Shlichta.

References

Insects described in 2012
Eumaeini
Lycaenidae of South America